The Palace of Spain or Monaldeschi Palace is a baroque palace that houses the Embassy of Spain to the Holy See since 1647. It does not lodge, on the other hand, the Embassy of Spain in Italy, since this one is in the first floor of the Borghese Palace of Rome.

Origins
The Embassy of Spain to the Holy See is the oldest embassy in the world. It was created in 1480 by King Ferdinand the Catholic, its first being ambassador Gonzalo de Beteta, knight of the Order of Santiago.

Among the political results of this diplomatic activity are the papal support for the Reconquest of Granada, the sharing of the New World between Spain and Portugal through the "Bull Inter Caetera" in 1493 (see Treaty of Tordesillas), the Holy League for the fight against the Turk culminating in the victory of Lepanto in 1571, among others.

Monaldeschi Palace: headquarters of the Embassy of Spain

The Spanish ambassadors had rented the Monaldeschi Palace for more than a decade. In 1647, the new ambassador, Íñigo Vélez de Guevara, 8th Count of Oñate, made an offer for the palace, owned by the Monaldeschi family, an old Roman noble family, through an Italian agent, Bernardino Barber, and later obtained the permission of purchase of the Congregation of Barons of the Pontifical State, that had the power to approve the sale of important palaces. Barber bought it for 22,000 Roman scudos and was immediately transferred to the Count of Oñate. Soon after, four other houses next to the palace were bought to expand the building.

In 1654, the palace was acquired by the Spanish crown as a permanent residence for ambassadors. King Philip IV sent 19,000 ducats for maintenance and repair.

Located in the famous Piazza di Spagna (Spain's Square), in the historic center of Rome, a square that in fact takes its name from the palace. The area of land occupied by the palace is 3589 m² (38 632 sq ft) with 11 000 m² (118 403 sq ft) of construction between plants and terraces that constitute one of the most beautiful and rich architectural works of the time.

Borromini designed the palace extension and traced the main staircase of the embassy and the lobby. The architect Antonio Del Grande (1625–1671) was the one who continued with the works. Between 1827 and 1834 Neoclassical and Pompeian decorations were introduced and a small wooden theater where Vittorio Alfieri premiered his Antigone on November 20, 1782, disappeared from the ballroom.

During the 17th and 18th centuries the palace was the center of a lavish and lively world of festivities that also animated the Piazza di Spagna, the scene of the most brilliant events of its time, public spectacles sponsored by the Spanish ambassador.

The embassy houses a collection of gobelin tapestries of the 17th century that belonged to the Bourbon-Orleans family from the Galliera Palace in Bologna, with Roman and biblical motifs. The walls of the formal dining room are adorned with three splendid woolen and silk tapestries from the 18th century, originating from the Royal Palace of Madrid, representing scenes from the life of Telemachus, according to cartons drawn by Rubens.

The halls have the presence of paintings of the Prado Museum of illustrious authors such as Federico Madrazo, Vicente López, Nattier, Mengs, Mario Nuzzi, among others. Among the sculptures stand out two busts by Gianlorenzo Bernini of 1619, El alma beata and El alma condenada.

On September 8, 1857, Pope Pius IX inaugurated the Column of the Immaculate Conception that presides over the Piazza di Spagna in memory of the definition of the dogma of the Immaculate of which Spain was a tenacious defender for centuries.

References

Bibliography

 
 

Palaces in Rome
Diplomatic missions in Rome
Diplomatic missions of Spain
Holy See–Spain relations
Diplomatic missions to the Holy See